I Rantzau (The Rantzau Family) is an opera in four acts by Pietro Mascagni (1892), based on a libretto by Guido Menasci and Giovanni Targioni-Tozzetti, based on the play Les Rantzau (1873) by French writers Erckmann and Chatrian, after their novel (1882) Les Deux Frères (The Two Brothers).

It was first performed at the Teatro della Pergola in Florence, Italy on 10 November 1892.

The overture is popular and was recorded in Berlin with Mascagni conducting in 1927. The soprano solo in Act 1 is an excellent example of true verismo aria, and has an emotional impact that parallels the composer's work in Cavalleria rusticana. The soprano/tenor duet is impressive enough (and has been recorded in modern times by Plácido Domingo and Renato Scotto), but the opera is perhaps the least revived of Mascagni's "other" operas, with only one recording made of the full opera.

Roles

References

Italian-language operas
Operas by Pietro Mascagni
1892 operas
Operas
Operas based on plays
Operas based on novels